Hebrizelm Hill (Halm Hebrizelm \'h&lm he-bri-'zelm\) is a rocky hill rising to 70 m on the south-west coast of Greenwich Island, South Shetland Islands. An offshoot of the hill is forming Kaspichan Point. The hill is named after the Thracian King Hebryzelmis, 389–384 BC.

Location

Maps
 L.L. Ivanov et al. Antarctica: Livingston Island and Greenwich Island, South Shetland Islands. Scale 1:100000 topographic map. Sofia: Antarctic Place-names Commission of Bulgaria, 2005.
 L.L. Ivanov. Antarctica: Livingston Island and Greenwich, Robert, Snow and Smith Islands. Scale 1:120000 topographic map.  Troyan: Manfred Wörner Foundation, 2009.

References
 Hebrizelm Hill. SCAR Composite Gazetteer of Antarctica
 Bulgarian Antarctic Gazetteer. Antarctic Place-names Commission. (details in Bulgarian, basic data in English)

External links
 Hebrizelm Hill. Copernix satellite image

Hills of Greenwich Island